Wangling Town is an urban town in You County, Hunan Province, People's Republic of China.

Cityscape
The town is divided into nine villages and two communities, the following areas: Dongjing Community, Ganxi Community, Luojiaping Village, Liwang Village, Liantan Village, Beilian Village, Beiping Village, Shengtang Village, Hongda Village, Jiangtang Village, and Xinghe Village (洞井社区、甘溪社区、罗家坪村、里旺村、涟滩村、北联村、北坪村、笙塘村、宏大村、江塘村、兴和村).

References

External links

Divisions of You County